Twiston is a village and a civil parish in the Ribble Valley District, in the English county of Lancashire. It is near the town of Clitheroe and the village of Downham (in whose parish the population of Twiston is now included). The parish is part of the Forest of Bowland Area of Outstanding Natural Beauty (AONB). It adjoins the Ribble Valley parishes of Downham and Rimington, and the Pendle parish of Barley-with-Wheatley Booth.

Twiston was once a township in the ancient parish of Whalley. This became a civil parish in 1866, forming part of the Clitheroe Rural District from 1894 till 1974.

Along with Chatburn and Downham, the parish makes up the Chatburn ward of Ribble Valley Borough Council.

Media gallery

See also

Listed buildings in Twiston

References 

 Genuki

External links

Civil parishes in Lancashire
Geography of Ribble Valley
Villages in Lancashire
Lime kilns in the United Kingdom